Boxfire Press is an American science fiction and fantasy publisher based in Washington, D.C.

From 2009 to early 2012, most of Boxfire's publications were short e-books. One 2010 example was Kuro Crow, an e-book of three short stories by San Diego CityBeat writer Dave Maass.

In May 2012, Boxfire Press announced it would stop selling individual short stories and instead offer them for free download in a shift toward long-form novels and anthologies. Instead, each month, a new short story would be made available to Boxfire Press' Storyed members.

Published works
Full-length works
 
 
 
 
 
 
 
 
 
 
Short works

References

American speculative fiction publishers
Science fiction publishers
Publishing companies established in 2010